Rolf Aamot (born in Bergen on 28 September 1934) is a Norwegian painter, film director, photographer and tonal-image composer. Since the 1950s, Aamot has been a pioneer within the field of electronic painting, exploring the emerging technology as it combines with the traditional arts of painting, music, film, theatre, and ballet. Aamot studied painting at the Oslo National Academy of the Arts (Norwegian National Academy of Craft and Art Industry and Norwegian National Academy of Fine Arts), and film at Dramatiska Institutet in Stockholm. Aamot is known for his work as a painter, electronic painter, art photographer, graphic artist, film director, tonal-image composer and cultural author. Much of his work consists of creating electronic tonal images and thus his work contains elements of photography but is hard to pigeon hole. It is frequently a form of performance art with abstract photographic elements. Since 1966, Aamot's works have been displayed in Scandinavia, France, Germany, Belgium, Italy, the Soviet Union and subsequently Russia, Poland, United States and Japan. His work can be found in several important public collections. Aamot has been represented at several international film and art festivals throughout the world.

Background
Aamot was, from a very early age, taught after Bauhaus principles by his father Randulf Aamot, a master carpenter and wood carver. In 1952, he had his first solo exhibit of paintings at the Paus Knudsen Gallery in Bergen. In 1953, at the age of 18, while still attending the Norwegian National Academy of Craft and Art Industry in Oslo, he was awarded a major public commission for the Natural History Museum at the University of Oslo. From 1957 until 1960, he studied at the Norwegian National Academy of Fine Arts with the painters Aage Storstein and Alexander Schultz, both of them firmly anchored in the effort to combine figuration and abstraction typical of the 1920s. He later studied Film at the Dramatic Institute in Stockholm.

Electronic art in television
Aamot's electronic tonal-image work "Evolution" (1966) with music by Arne Nordheim was shown on Norwegian television in 1967. "Evolution" represented a milestone of a new art form in which television for the first time was used as an independent picture-artistic means of expression. Throughout the 1960s, 1970s, and 1980s, Aamot created a series of works for television.

Video art and digital photopaintings
Aamot became a controversial artist in the 1960s and 1970s. From the latter half of the 1980s, he worked with computer paintings on canvas, digital photopaintings and graphic art. He has continued to make video and film art, often in collaboration with the painter and composer Bjørg Lødøen and the photographer, dancer and choreographer Kristin Lodoen Linder.

Selected works

Tonal-image compositions for screen

Television 
"Evolution" (1966)
"Relieff nr.2" (1967–68)
"BSK" (1968)
"Visual" (1971)
"Progress" (1977)
"Structures" (1979)
"Medusa" (1986)
"Puls" (1986)
"Close cluster" (Nærklang) (1987)
"Expulsion" (1987)

Cinema
"Relieff" (1966–67)
"Kinetic Energy" (1967–68)
"Vision" (1969)
"Structures" (1970)
"Actio" (1980)
"Aurora Borealis" (1991)
"Tide" (2000)
"Energy" (2003)
"U" (2005)
"Ir" (2006)
"Wirr" (2008)
"Contra" (2009)
"X" (2010)

Note

References

External links 
 Rolf Aamot official website
 Interview, 1 November 2010. "Rolf Aamot: One Of The World's Pioneers In Digital Art"
 Store Norske Leksikon (Norwegian encyclopedia)
 Bjørg Lødøen official website
 Kristin Lødøen official website
 Art at the Worker´s Place, Oslo, Norway
 Store norske leksikon (Norwegian encyclopedia), (Kunnskapsforlaget, Oslo, Norway).
 Norsk biografisk leksikon (Norwegian biography encyclopedia), 1999-2005 band 10, (Kunnskapsforlaget, Oslo, Norway).
 Allgemeines Künstler-Lexikon, band 1, München and Leipzig: K. G. Saur, 1992. 

20th-century Norwegian painters
21st-century Norwegian painters
Norwegian male painters
21st-century Norwegian male artists
Norwegian photographers
Dramatiska Institutet alumni
Norwegian film directors
1934 births
Living people
Artists from Bergen
20th-century Norwegian male artists